Carlos Andres San Martín (born 19 November 1993) is a Colombian track and field athlete who competes as a steeplechaser.

Career
San Martín competed in the 3000m steeplechase at the 2019 World Athletics Championships in Doha, running 8:35.10. He also competed at the 2019 Pan American Games in Lima, Peru running a time of 8:32.34 to claim the silver medal in the  Men's 3000 metres steeplechase behind Altobeli da Silva of Brazil.

He won the 3000m steeplechase at the 2019 South American Championships in Athletics, and was runner up in 2021. Prior to that he won bronze in the 1500m in 2017.

San Martín competed in the 3000 metres steeplechase at the 2020 Summer Olympics, where he ran 8:33.47 to finish twelfth in heat one.

References

1993 births
Living people
Athletes (track and field) at the 2020 Summer Olympics
Olympic athletes of Colombia
Colombian male steeplechase runners
Pan American Games competitors for Colombia
Athletes (track and field) at the 2019 Pan American Games
Colombian male middle-distance runners
Competitors at the 2018 Central American and Caribbean Games
Central American and Caribbean Games bronze medalists for Colombia
Central American and Caribbean Games medalists in athletics
Pan American Games silver medalists for Colombia
Pan American Games medalists in athletics (track and field)
Medalists at the 2019 Pan American Games
21st-century Colombian people